Caroline Paul (born July 29, 1963, in New York City) is an American writer of fiction and non-fiction.

Early years and education
Caroline Paul was raised in New York City; Paris, France; and Cornwall, Connecticut. Her father was an investment banker, her mother a social worker. She was educated in journalism and documentary film at Stanford University.

Career
She volunteered as a journalist at Berkeley public radio station KPFA before (in 1988) joining the San Francisco Fire Department, as one of the first women hired by the department. She worked most of her career on Rescue 2, where she and her crew were responsible for search and rescue in fires. Rescue 2 members were also trained and sent on SCUBA dive searches, rope and rappelling rescues, surf rescues, confined space rescues, all hazardous material calls, and the most severe train and car wrecks.

Her first book was the nonfiction memoir Fighting Fire, published in 1998. It was a finalist at the Northern California Book Awards and an alternate selection for the Book of the Month Club. Her second, the 2006 historical novel East Wind, Rain is based on the Niihau Incident, a historical event in which a Japanese pilot crash-landed on the private Hawaiian island of Niihau, after the attack on Pearl Harbor. "When it's over, we don't want to leave," said the New York Times review of the book. Lost Cat, A True Story of Love, Desperation, and GPS Technology was published in 2013 and illustrated by her partner, artist Wendy MacNaughton. It details Paul and MacNaughton's high-tech search for their cat. The PBS Newshour described the book as "A thoughtful, kind and funny story about the love people can have for their pets and the weird places that this love and accompanying devotion can take them. But it also travels beyond the realm of human-pet relationships, offering commentary on all relationships and the roles of those we love, and sometimes don't love, in our lives."

In 2016, Paul published The Gutsy Girl, Escapades for Your Life of Epic Adventure. She calls it "Lean in for girls, set not in a boardroom, but in trees, on cliff edges and down wild rivers". In a controversial New York Times essay that preceded publication she wrote that risk teaches kids responsibility, problem solving, and confidence. "...By cautioning girls away from these experiences we are not protecting them. We are woefully under-preparing them for life." The Gutsy Girl became a New York Times bestseller.

Her TED talk explains why it is important that girls get out of their comfort zones and learn to take risks when they are young.

In 2018 Paul collaborated with tea expert Sebastian Beckwith, and published A Little Tea Book.

She is a member of the San Francisco Writers’ Grotto, a workspace and literary community whose members have included Ingrid Rojas Contreras, Po Bronson, Mary Roach, ZZ Packer, Noah Hawley, Vanessa Hua, Ethan Canin, Julia Scheeres, Vendela Vida, and TJ Stiles.

Personal life 
In 2018, Paul and MacNaughton were married.

Caroline Paul's identical twin is Baywatch actress Alexandra Paul. Due to Alexandra's fame on Baywatch, Caroline Paul was often mistaken for her twin sister even when in full firefighter gear. The two sisters were featured in a People magazine feature on twins, "Seeing Double," in 1998. Her younger brother Jonathan Paul is a militant animal rights activist; he was once a leader of the Animal Liberation Front, considered by the US government to be a domestic terrorism group. The ALF’s mission was to free animals from captivity, often from medical research labs and puppy mills. He was released in 2011 after serving a four-year sentence in federal prison for the 1997 arson of a slaughterhouse in Redmond, Oregon.

Paul flies ultralights, paragliders and gyrocopters. An accomplished athlete, she trained at Lake Placid in the sport of luge, and became one of the first women to participate in the sport of skeleton, which at the time excluded females. She lobbied its governing body, the US Bobsled Association, to join the team but was denied because of her gender.

Paul has a chapter giving advice in Tim Ferriss' book Tools of Titans.

Works
 Fighting Fire,  (author's page)
 East Wind, Rain,  (author's page)
 Lost Cat,  (author's page)
 The Gutsy Girl,  (author's page) 
 A Little Tea Book, ISBN 9781632869029 (author's page)
 You Are Mighty, ISBN 978-1681198224 (author's page)

External links
Caroline Paul's official website

References

1963 births
Living people
20th-century American novelists
21st-century American novelists
American women novelists
Writers from California
Identical twins
American twins
American lesbian writers
American LGBT novelists
20th-century American women writers
21st-century American women writers
American women non-fiction writers
20th-century American non-fiction writers
21st-century American non-fiction writers
LGBT people from Connecticut
LGBT people from California
Novelists from Connecticut
21st-century American LGBT people